The Portland Open Invitational was a professional golf tournament in the northwest United States on the PGA Tour, played in Portland, Oregon.  Established by Robert A. Hudson with a $10,000 purse in 1944, it was played from 1944 to 1948 and again from 1959 to 1966. The event was hosted eight times at the Portland Golf Club, and four times at the Columbia Edgewater Country Club. First played as the Portland Open, the revived 1959 event played as the Portland Centennial Open Invitational, in honor of Oregon's centennial of statehood.

Sam Snead won the inaugural event in 1944, and Ben Hogan won in 1945 by fourteen strokes, and also won the 1946 PGA Championship, then a match play event, held at the Portland Golf Club. The club also hosted the Ryder Cup in 1947; the U.S. team was captained by Hogan and won 11–1. Hogan was a runner-up in 1948, a stroke back in an 18-hole playoff.

The tournament was dominated by three-time winners Billy Casper (1959–61) and Jack Nicklaus (1962, 1964–65). Nicklaus' $3,500 win during his rookie season in 1962 concluded three weeks of victories; he took the massive winner's share of $50,000 in the exhibition World Series of Golf in Ohio, and then won his second tour title at the Seattle Open Invitational, which paid $4,300. Both Casper and Nicklaus won at both courses.

Bert Yancey won the last edition in 1966 and took only 102 putts. It stood as the tour's 72-hole record for fewest putts for over a decade, until Bob Menne had only 99 at the Tournament Players Championship in 1977, but tied for 47th.

Tournament hosts

Winners

Playoffs
1948: 18-hole Monday playoff: Haas 70 (−2), Hogan 71 (−1), Palmer 75 (+3).
1963: Knudson chipped in for eagle on the first playoff hole, a par-5, for the win; Rudolph nearly matched it, but his bounced out.

See also
WinCo Foods Portland Open, a current event on the Korn Ferry Tour
Cambia Portland Classic, a current event on the LPGA Tour

References

Former PGA Tour events
Golf in Oregon
Sports in Portland, Oregon
Sports competitions in Oregon
Annual events in Portland, Oregon
Recurring sporting events established in 1944
Recurring sporting events disestablished in 1966
1944 establishments in Oregon
1966 disestablishments in Oregon